João Poupada (born 5 March 1965) is a Portuguese bobsledder. He competed in the two man and the four man events at the 1988 Winter Olympics.

References

1965 births
Living people
Portuguese male bobsledders
Olympic bobsledders of Portugal
Bobsledders at the 1988 Winter Olympics
Place of birth missing (living people)